The Vernal Utah Temple is the fifty-first temple of the Church of Jesus Christ of Latter-day Saints (LDS Church). Located in Vernal it is the tenth LDS temple built in the state of Utah.

Upon its dedication November 2, 1997, the Vernal Temple was unique as the only LDS temple built from a previously existing structure. Since 1997, the Copenhagen Denmark, Manhattan New York, and Provo City Center temples have been similarly adapted from existing structures.

History
Originally, the building served as the Uintah Stake Tabernacle for Latter-day Saints in eastern Utah. The Tabernacle's foundation was constructed of nearby sandstone with walls built of four layers of fired brick from local clay. The building was built with considerable donated labor from the fall of 1899 until it was dedicated on August 24, 1907, by LDS Church president Joseph F. Smith. Smith reportedly said he would not be surprised if a temple was built there some day.

Relative to other LDS Tabernacles, Roger Jackson characterized the Uintah Stake Tabernacle as relatively modest, without the decorative details found on Tabernacles in central and northern Utah. Nonetheless, he wrote, "the building is the most prominent structure in Vernal and considered the finest building in all of eastern Utah."

The tabernacle was superseded by an adjacent, more modern LDS stake center in 1948. Only used irregularly thereafter, the LDS Church announced the Tabernacle's closing in 1984 for public safety reasons. Among other things, the Tabernacle lacked indoor bathrooms and access for the disabled.

A local "Save the Tabernacle" committee formed, and in 1989 a preservation study was prepared. The LDS Church opted to turn the building into one of its new smaller temples, and plans were announced in 1994. In addition to preserving the exterior, bringing the building up to code, and altering the floor plan, the eastern spire of the temple was elongated to make it taller than the spire of the neighboring stake center. A golden statue of angel Moroni was placed on top of the spire facing east, a common element of almost all LDS Temples.

Over 120,000 visited the temple during its two-week open house in October 1997.

In 2020, like all the church's other temples, the Vernal Utah Temple was closed due to the COVID-19 pandemic.

See also

 The Church of Jesus Christ of Latter-day Saints in Utah
 Comparison of temples of The Church of Jesus Christ of Latter-day Saints
 List of temples of The Church of Jesus Christ of Latter-day Saints
 List of temples of The Church of Jesus Christ of Latter-day Saints by geographic region
 Temple architecture (Latter-day Saints)

References

Additional reading
 
 
 
 . Additional information from Mormon Literature & Creative Arts.

External links
 
 Vernal Utah Temple Official site
 Vernal Utah Temple at ChurchofJesusChristTemples.org
 90-year-old tabernacle in Vernal looks to a historic future, Desert News article from 1997 about the transformation of the tabernacle into a temple.

1997 establishments in Utah
20th-century Latter Day Saint temples
Buildings and structures in Uintah County, Utah
Religious buildings and structures completed in 1997
Temples (LDS Church) in Utah